Chen Shixiang (1905–1988), also known as Sicien H. Chen, was a Chinese entomologist. A native of Jiaxing, Zhejiang, he graduated from Fudan University in Shanghai in 1928 before going to France for his doctoral work at the University of Paris. He returned to China in 1935. From 1954 to 1982 he was the director of the Entomological Society of China (中国昆虫学会). He also founded the journal Acta Zootaxonomica Sinica, of which he was editor-in-chief from 1954 to 1969.

References

1905 births
1988 deaths
20th-century Chinese zoologists
Academic journal editors
Biologists from Zhejiang
Chinese entomologists
Chinese expatriates in France
Coleopterists
Fudan University alumni
Members of the Chinese Academy of Sciences
Scientists from Jiaxing
University of Paris alumni